"Rock It" is a rockabilly single by country music singer George Jones.  Not wanting to use his real name and jeopardize his reputation as a country artist, Starday Records released it under the pseudonym "Thumper Jones."

Background
With the explosion in popularity of Elvis Presley in 1956, country music lost a sizeable portion of its young audience and scrambled to adapt.  As biographer Bob Allen put it in his book George Jones: The Life and Times of a Honky Tonk Legend, "It temporarily sent the country music industry sprawling flat on its ass.  Sales figures for country music plummeted dangerously, and soon even the most dedicated country artists - as a matter of sheer professional survival - were all rushing to pump some Elvis glottal bestiality into their own music." Jones, who had played with both Elvis and Johnny Cash on the Louisiana Hayride, and his producer Pappy Daily decided to give rockabilly a shot, recording two songs Jones wrote: "Rock It" and "Dadgumit, How Come It." As Jones explained to Billboard in 2006: "I was desperate. When you're hungry, a poor man with a house full of kids, you're gonna do some things you ordinarily wouldn't do. I said, 'Well, hell, I'll try anything once.' I tried 'Dadgum It How Come It' and 'Rock It', a bunch of shit. I didn't want my name on the rock and roll thing, so I told them to put Thumper Jones on it and if it did something, good, if it didn't, hell, I didn't want to be shamed with it."

Jones and Daily came up with the name Thumper Jones, but the single failed to chart. Jones retained a lifelong disdain for the rock and roll sides he cut during this time, joking in his 1995 autobiography I Lived to Tell It All, "During the years, when I've encountered those records, I've used them for Frisbees." However, some critics disagree, with Nick Tosches noting in his 1994 Texas Monthly article "The Devil in George Jones", "Though Jones would never acknowledge it, the rockabilly impulse of the early fifties had affected his sound as much as the lingering voices of Acuff and Williams. 'Play It Cool, Man, Play It Cool,' recorded by Jones in 1954, several months before Elvis's debut, had bordered on pure rockabilly..." In the 1989 Jones documentary Same Ole Me, Johnny Cash insisted, "George Jones woulda been a really hot rockabilly artist if he'd approached it from that angle. Well, he was, really, but never got the credit for it."  Moreover, Jones' first #1 country hit, "White Lightning", was written by J.P. Richardson, better known as rockabilly star the Big Bopper, and also had a rock and roll edge.

References

1956 singles
George Jones songs